The 1992 Philadelphia Eagles season was their 60th in the National Football League (NFL). The team fought through adversity from the outset and improved upon their previous output of 10–6, winning eleven games and returning to the playoffs after a year out.

This was the first season the team was sponsored by the Russell Athletic brand until the 1996 season.

After winning four in a row and five of their last six regular-season games, the Birds kept the momentum going and posted their first playoff victory since the 1980 NFC Championship Game, topping the Saints in New Orleans in the Wild Card playoffs. It was also their first playoff win on the road since the 1949 NFL Championship Game.
Season highlights included: the first 4–0 start since going 6–0 to begin the 1981 campaign, a home shutout of the Denver Broncos on September 20, a memorable seven-play goal-line stand in a 7–3 win over the Cardinals on October 25, a come-from-behind 47–34 win over the New York Giants at the Meadowlands (which included a Vai Sikahema punt return for a touchdown and his iconic boxing with the padding at the base of the goal posts), and cornerback Eric Allen batting away a Mark Rypien pass at the goal line to seal a playoff-spot-clinching 17–13 decision against the Washington Redskins on December 20. 

The entire season was the focus of Mark Bowden's best-selling book "Bringing the Heat", which also dealt in great detail with prominent recent-term figures who were not with the 1992 Eagles, including tight end Keith Jackson who became the first prominent NFL player to use his newly-granted rights of full and unrestricted free agency and signed a deal with the Miami Dolphins several weeks into the season, and former coach Buddy Ryan who struggled through a TV commentator's role two years after he was fired as the Eagles coach but remained a huge (and not always positive) influence on the 1992 Eagles (particularly through the defensive players who loved Ryan and remained loyal to him, and who were lukewarm at best about Rich Kotite's leadership). Bowden's book also described the personal issues that Eagles players faced, the friction between how injuries should be (or were) treated by the team's medical staff, and the story of hugely successful but haunted then-team owner Norman Braman.

Offseason 
The Eagles were represented at the 1992 Winter Olympics in Albertville, as Herschel Walker represented the United States in the two-man bobsled event. Walker and Brian Shimer's sled finished seventh and missed a medal by 0.32 seconds, and was the higher finishing American team.

Jerome Brown's death 
Tragedy struck the team when, on June 25, 1992, defensive tackle Jerome Brown lost control of his Chevrolet Corvette at high speed before crashing into an electric pole, killing Brown and his nephew Gus. Later that evening in Philadelphia, in front of a large gathering at Veterans Stadium and a national television audience who were participating in a Billy Graham Crusade, Reggie White broke the news of his teammate's passing to the shock of the audience.

The Eagles retired number 99 in honor of Brown, kept his locker untouched, and wore a patch with his initials and number on their jerseys. They also adopted the rallying cry "Bring It Home For Jerome", referring to their desire to win the Super Bowl for their fallen teammate.

NFL draft 

The Eagles had a 10–6 record in 1991 and tied with three other teams. Because of this they selected the 16th to 20th pick on a rotating basis in the 12 rounds. They traded away their first round pick earlier, which was made by the Dallas Cowboys. With their pick in the second round they chose Siran Stacy, a running back out of the University of Alabama. The Eagles selected 12 players over the 12 rounds.

Personnel

Staff

Roster

Regular season

Schedule 

Note: Intra-division opponents are in bold text.

Game summaries

Week 1: vs. New Orleans Saints 

 Source: Pro-Football-Reference.com

Week 2: at Phoenix Cardinals 

 Source: Pro-Football-Reference.com

Week 3: vs. Denver Broncos 

 Source: Pro-Football-Reference.com

Week 5: vs. Dallas Cowboys 

 Source: Pro-Football-Reference.com

Week 6: at Kansas City Chiefs 

 Source: Pro-Football-Reference.com

This game ended the longest ever gap between two NFL teams meeting – it was the first occasion the Eagles had opposed the Chiefs since October 22, 1972, and only their second-ever matchup. This occurred because in previous seasons when the AFC West and NFC East met each other, either the Eagles or the Chiefs (but never both) finished in fifth position and did not play the ordinary set of interconference games.

Week 7: at Washington Redskins

Week 8: vs. Phoenix Cardinals

Week 9: at Dallas Cowboys 

 Source: Pro-Football-Reference.com

Week 10: vs. Los Angeles Raiders 

 Source: Pro-Football-Reference.com

Week 11: at Green Bay Packers 

 Source: Pro-Football-Reference.com

Week 12: at New York Giants 

 Source: Pro-Football-Reference.com

Week 13: at San Francisco 49ers 

 Source: Pro-Football-Reference.com

Week 14: vs. Minnesota Vikings 

 Source: Pro-Football-Reference.com

Week 15: at Seattle Seahawks 

 Source: Pro-Football-Reference.com

Week 16: vs. Washington Redskins 

 Source: Pro-Football-Reference.com

Week 17: vs. New York Giants 

 Source: Pro-Football-Reference.com

Standings

Playoffs

NFC Wild Card: at New Orleans Saints 

 Source: Pro-Football-Reference.com

NFC Divisional: at Dallas Cowboys 

 Source: Pro-Football-Reference.com

References

Further reading 
 Bringing the Heat (1994), an account by Mark Bowden of the 1992 Philadelphia Eagles season

External links 
 1992 Philadelphia Eagles at Pro-Football-Reference.com

Philadelphia Eagles seasons
Philadelphia Eagles
Philadelphia Eagles